Siu Sai Wan is one of the 35 constituencies in the Eastern District.

The constituency returns one district councillor to the Eastern District Council, with an election every four years. The seat was last held by Chan Wing-tai.

Siu Sai Wan constituency is loosely based on Siu Sai Wan Estate with estimated population of 12,460.

Councillors represented

Election results

2010s

2000s

1990s

Notes

References

Siu Sai Wan
Constituencies of Hong Kong
Constituencies of Eastern District Council
1994 establishments in Hong Kong
Constituencies established in 1994